Patrick Douglas Purcell (born 17 March 1947) is an Australian politician. He was a Labor member of the Legislative Assembly of Queensland for Bulimba from 1992 to 2009.

Early life 
Purcell was born in the New South Wales town of Cowra. Prior to election to parliament he was the secretary of the Australian Building Construction Employees' and Builders Labourers' Federation (Queensland Branch).

Politics 
Purcell entered parliament at the 1992 state election as the member for Bulimba. He held the seat until his retirement in 2009.

Purcell served as the Minister for Emergency Services from July 2005 to July 2007 in the Beattie Ministry. Before that he was the Parliamentary Secretary to the Minister for Public Works, Housing and Racing. On 4 July 2007, Pat Purcell announced he would resign as Minister after allegations arose that he assaulted two public servants. The subsequently proven allegations forced the then Queensland Premier Anna Bligh told him "he had no choice but to resign". Those charges were subsequently withdrawn following mediation.

Purcell did not contest the 2009 Queensland state election.

References

1947 births
Living people
Members of the Queensland Legislative Assembly
People from Cowra
Australian Labor Party members of the Parliament of Queensland
21st-century Australian politicians